The first season of the American television series The Flash premiered on The CW on October 7, 2014, and concluded on May 19, 2015, after airing 23 episodes. The series is based on the DC Comics character Barry Allen / Flash, a costumed superhero crime-fighter with the power to move at superhuman speeds. It is a spin-off from Arrow, existing in the same fictional universe, and was produced by Berlanti Productions, Warner Bros. Television, and DC Entertainment, with Andrew Kreisberg serving as showrunner.

The series follows Allen, portrayed by Grant Gustin, a crime scene investigator who gains super-human speed, which he uses to fight criminals, including others who have also gained superhuman abilities. The season follows Barry getting his super speed from an accident caused by Star Labs who helps him fight criminals who also get powers from the same accident and helping Barry pursue his mother's killer the Reverse-Flash. Gustin is joined by main cast members Candice Patton, Danielle Panabaker, Rick Cosnett, Carlos Valdes, Tom Cavanagh, and Jesse L. Martin. The Flash was picked up for a full season by The CW in October 2014, and filming took place primarily in Vancouver, British Columbia, Canada.

The series premiere was watched by 4.8 million viewers and had a 1.9 18–49 demographic rating, making it The CW's most watched and highest rated series premiere since The Vampire Diaries in 2009. It also became The CW's second-most watched series premiere ever, behind 90210, and the third-highest rated in the 18–49 demographic. The first season finished as the 118th ranked show, with an average viewership of 4.62 million, making it the most watched series ever on The CW, and also the highest rated series among men 18–49 and men 18+ ever on the network. The first season of The Flash received generally positive reviews from critics. Reviews for the series became increasingly positive as the season progressed, with the finale receiving critical acclaim. The series was renewed for a second season on January 11, 2015.

Episodes

Cast and characters

Main 
 Grant Gustin as Barry Allen / Flash 
 Candice Patton as Iris West 
 Danielle Panabaker as Caitlin Snow 
 Rick Cosnett as Eddie Thawne
 Carlos Valdes as Cisco Ramon 
 Tom Cavanagh as Eobard Thawne / Reverse-Flash and Harrison Wells
 Jesse L. Martin as Joe West

Recurring

 Robbie Amell as Ronnie Raymond / Firestorm
 Clancy Brown as General Wade Eiling
 Victor Garber as Martin Stein / Firestorm
 Michelle Harrison as Nora Allen
 Roger Howarth as Mason Bridge
 Malese Jow as Linda Park
 Wentworth Miller as Leonard Snart / Captain Cold
 Patrick Sabongui as David Singh
 John Wesley Shipp as Henry Allen

Guest

Production

Development
On July 30, 2013, it was announced that Arrow co-creators Greg Berlanti and Andrew Kreisberg, Arrow pilot director David Nutter, and DC Comics CCO Geoff Johns would develop a television series based on the Flash for The CW, and it would detail Barry Allen's origin. Kreisberg revealed after the announcement that Allen would first appear as a recurring character on Arrow in three episodes of season two—all written by Berlanti, Kreisberg and Johns—and the last of the episodes would act as a backdoor pilot for the new show. Kreisberg added that Allen would be a forensic scientist and the introduction of his superpowers, as well as the reactions to this, will be very human and grounded. Johns stated that the character of the Flash in the show would resemble his comic book counterpart, complete with his trademark red costume, and not be a poor imitation. Kreisberg elaborated: "No sweat suits or strange code names; he will be The Flash." While researching the best way to depict the Flash's lightning speed, Johns stated it would not just be the standard "blurring around".

Barry ultimately appeared twice in Arrows second season, with the planned backdoor pilot canceled in favor of a traditional pilot by The CW executives, who had been impressed by early cuts of Barry's first two episodes on Arrow. This allowed the creative team to flesh out Barry's story and his world on a bigger budget, as opposed to a backdoor pilot's constraint of incorporating characters from the parent show. The pilot was officially ordered on January 29, 2014, and was written by Berlanti, Kreisberg, and Johns, and directed by Nutter. On May 8, 2014, The Flash was officially picked up as a series, with an initial order of 13 episodes. Three more scripts were ordered in September 2014 following a positive response to newly completed episodes by executives, while a back ten was ordered on October 21, 2014, for a full 23-episode season.

In July 2014, Johns described the series as "the most faithful DC Comics adaptation ever... We've incorporated almost everything of the mythology into it and added a new backstory with S.T.A.R. Labs." In October 2014, Johns explained that DC's approach to their films and television series would be different from Marvel Studios' cinematic universe, stating that their film universe and TV universes would be kept separate within a multiverse to allow "everyone to make the best possible product, to tell the best story, to do the best world."

Casting 

On September 13, 2013, Grant Gustin was cast in the titular role of Barry Allen / Flash. Andy Mientus, who would eventually be cast as Hartley Rathaway, also auditioned for the role. Gustin began researching the character during the audition process, and reading as many comics as possible. Gustin primarily focused on The New 52 series of comics, because he knew it would be difficult to read everything and he felt the New 52 was the closest to the show's "look and feel". In January 2014, actor Jesse L. Martin was cast as Detective Joe West, while Rick Cosnett was cast as Eddie Thawne and Danielle Panabaker as Caitlin Snow. In February 2014, Candice Patton was cast as Iris West and Carlos Valdes as Cisco Ramon. Patton's casting as Iris caused significant backlash among comic book fans due to Patton being of African descent, while Iris has typically been depicted as a Caucasian woman in comics. Though the writers discussed early on to make Barry and Caitlin lovers, Gustin vetoed this idea in favour of Barry and Iris, as in the comics. Also in February 2014, The Hollywood Reporter reported that the remaining regular roles to be cast were for the parts of Harrison Wells and Hartley Rathaway. On February 10, 2014, Tom Cavanagh was cast as Harrison Wells, with his role described as "a rock star in the world of physics and the mind and money behind Central City's S.T.A.R. Labs Particle Accelerator". It was eventually revealed that Cavanagh's character was actually Eobard Thawne, who stole the appearance of the real Wells (also portrayed by Cavanagh) after killing him, with Matt Letscher portraying Thawne's original likeness.

Several cast members from the 1990 television series appear in the series. John Wesley Shipp, who portrayed Barry Allen/Flash in the 1990 series, joined the cast in a recurring role as Barry's father, Dr. Henry Allen, and Amanda Pays once again portrays a character named Dr. Tina McGee. In the episode "Tricksters", Mark Hamill returns as James Jesse / Trickster and Vito D'Ambrosio plays Mayor Anthony Bellows (a character he played in 1991, but as a police officer), with images of Hamill as Trickster from the 1990 TV series being used in a police report.

Design
The Flash costume was designed by Colleen Atwood. While remaining largely faithful to Barry's costume from the comics, it was designed as a more "functional, textured quality" costume than previous live-action Flash ones.

Filming
Production on the pilot began in March 2014, with filming taking place in Vancouver, British Columbia; additional filming for the series takes place in Portland, Oregon. On how action sequences are shot for the series, compared to Arrow, Gustin said, "When [Arrow] shoot(s) action sequences, pretty much what you see is what you get and they're really doing everything. We do a lot of plate shots that are empty shots of the area we’re going to be in and then they’re putting us in later in post. I do a lot of the fighting. I don’t have to do it full speed and then they ramp it up and a lot of people have to freeze and I keep moving. Then I have to clear frame and step back into frame. It’s really tedious stuff that we have to do. On theirs, they learn fight choreography and they shoot it from the perfect angles and what you see is what you get."

Filming for the rest of the season began on July 11, 2014 and, ended on April 14, 2015.

Music

Arrow composer Blake Neely is the primary composer of the series, and was first hired in April 2014 to score the pilot. He had previously composed a theme for Barry Allen which was featured in Arrows season two episodes "The Scientist" and "Three Ghosts". The theme was titled "The Scientist" when it was released on the Arrow: Season 2 soundtrack. According to Neely, "It had to be different [from Arrow] ... but it also couldn't be so different that it couldn't fit in the Arrow universe, ... it had to be in a style that could hold hands with Arrow." On December 18, 2014, WaterTower Music released a selection of music from The Flash/Arrow crossover episodes, as well as two bonus tracks from their respective 2014 midseason finales. The first season, two-disc soundtrack was released on October 16, 2015 by La La Land Records.

All music composed by Blake Neely.

Arrowverse tie-ins
In March 2014, it was announced that Gustin would not appear in a third episode of Arrow as originally planned. However, Panabaker and Valdes appear in the Arrow episode "The Man Under the Hood" in their roles as Caitlin Snow and Cisco Ramon, respectively. Arrow executive producer Marc Guggenheim stated, "This was something that really came about because obviously Barry is in a coma at the end of ["Three Ghosts"]. That pretty much made it impossible for Barry to appear in [the third episode, as originally planned]... The idea of bringing in [Caitlin Snow and Cisco Ramon] really, really appealed to us because it allowed us to honor our original intention [of] doing something Flash-related around episode 19 or 20 [of season two] without having comatose Barry and basically paying Grant Gustin a lot of money to sit around with his eyes closed just unconscious the whole episode... It allows us to further flesh out the Flash universe in Arrow." Gustin had a brief cameo appearance in the Arrow season three premiere, "The Calm". Valdes appeared once again in the season three episode "Broken Arrow", while Gustin appeared in the final episode of season three, "My Name is Oliver Queen".

Stephen Amell appears as Oliver Queen / Arrow in the pilot episode. Kreisberg announced that Emily Bett Rickards would appear in the fourth episode as Felicity. Previous Arrow adversary William Tockman / The Clock King (Robert Knepper) was in the seventh episode. Members of The Royal Flush Gang, who previously appeared on Arrow, made a cameo appearance in the eleventh episode of the series. Rickards and Brandon Routh as Ray Palmer had scenes in the eighteenth episode, "All Star Team Up". Katie Cassidy and Paul Blackthorne, as Laurel Lance / Black Canary and Detective Quentin Lance, respectively, appeared in the following episode, "Who Is Harrison Wells?", while Amell and Doug Jones as Jake Simmons / Deathbolt appeared in the twenty-second episode, "Rogue Air".

"Flash vs. Arrow"

On July 18, 2014, Kreisberg stated that a crossover event would occur in the eighth episode of the first season of The Flash and the third season of Arrow, respectively. In early January 2015, The CW president Mark Pedowitz announced the intention to do a Flash/Arrow crossover every season, after the success of the first one.

Marketing
In April 2015, to celebrate the season three finale of Arrow and season one finale of The Flash, The CW released a short promo titled "Superhero Fight Club". The short features characters from Arrow and The Flash battling each other in a hero vs. villain showdown. Characters include Arrow, Flash, Arsenal, Black Canary, Merlyn, Captain Cold, Heat Wave, Firestorm, Ra's al Ghul, Reverse-Flash, and the A.T.O.M. in a cage match fight.

Release

Broadcast

The Flash was screened at the Warner Bros. Television and DC Entertainment panel at San Diego Comic-Con International in July 2014. The series officially premiered on The CW on October 7, 2014, during the 2014–15 television season and also premiered in Canada on the same night. The second episode was screened at New York Comic Con on October 9, 2014, as a way to repay the viewers that watched the series' premiere episode. The series premiered in the United Kingdom and Ireland on October 28, 2014, and in Australia on December 3, 2014.

Home media
The season began streaming on Netflix on October 6, 2015, and was released on Blu-ray and DVD in Region 1 on September 22, 2015.

Copyright infringement
The first season of The Flash was the fifth most-pirated TV series in 2015.

Reception

Ratings 
{{Television episode ratings
| title    = The Flash season 1

| title1   = Pilot
| date1    = October 7, 2014
| rs1      = 1.9/6
| viewers1 = 4.83
| dvr1     = 0.7
| dvrv1    = 2.00
| total1   = 2.6
| totalv1  = 6.83

| title2   = Fastest Man Alive
| date2    = October 14, 2014
| rs2      = 1.7/5
| viewers2 = 4.27
| dvr2     = n/a
| dvrv2    = n/a
| total2   = n/a
| totalv2  = n/a

| title3   = Things You Can't Outrun
| date3    = October 21, 2014
| rs3      = 1.5/4
| viewers3 = 3.59
| dvr3     = 0.5
| dvrv3    = 1.63
| total3   = 2.0
| totalv3  = 5.22

| title4   = Going Rogue
| date4    = October 28, 2014
| rs4      = 1.4/4
| viewers4 = 3.53
| dvr4     = 0.9
| dvrv4    = n/a
| total4   = 2.3
| totalv4  = n/a

| title5   = Plastique
| date5    = November 11, 2014
| rs5      = 1.4/4
| viewers5 = 3.46
| dvr5     = 1.0
| dvrv5    = n/a
| total5   = 2.4
| totalv5  = n/a

| title6   = The Flash Is Born
| date6    = November 18, 2014
| rs6      = 1.4/4
| viewers6 = 3.73
| dvr6     = 0.9
| dvrv6    = n/a
| total6   = 2.3
| totalv6  = n/a

| title7   = Power Outage
| date7    = November 25, 2014
| rs7      = 1.4/4
| viewers7 = 3.47
| dvr7     = 0.9
| dvrv7    = 2.41
| total7   = 2.3
| totalv7  = 5.88

| title8   = Flash vs. Arrow
| date8    = December 2, 2014
| rs8      = 1.6/5
| viewers8 = 4.34
| dvr8     = 1.0
| dvrv8    = 2.31
| total8   = 2.6
| totalv8  = 6.65

| title9   = The Man in the Yellow Suit
| date9    = December 9, 2014
| rs9      = 1.5/5
| viewers9 = 4.66
| dvr9     = 0.9
| dvrv9    = 2.06
| total9   = 2.4
| totalv9  = 6.72

| title10   = Revenge of the Rogues
| date10    = January 20, 2015
| rs10      = 1.4/5
| viewers10 = 3.87
| dvr10     = 1.0
| dvrv10    = 2.41
| total10   = 2.4
| totalv10  = 6.27

| title11   = The Sound and the Fury
| date11    = January 27, 2015
| rs11      = 1.3/4
| viewers11 = 4.08
| dvr11     = 1.0
| dvrv11    = 2.20
| total11   = 2.3
| totalv11  = 6.28

| title12   = Crazy for You
| date12    = February 3, 2015
| rs12      = 1.3/4
| viewers12 = 3.60
| dvr12     = 0.9
| dvrv12    = n/a
| total12   = 2.2
| totalv12  = n/a

| title13   = The Nuclear Man
| date13    = February 10, 2015
| rs13      = 1.5/5
| viewers13 = 3.66
| dvr13     = 0.6
| dvrv13    = 1.39
| total13   = 2.1
| totalv13  = 5.05

| title14   = Fallout
| date14    = February 17, 2015
| rs14      = 1.5/4
| viewers14 = 4.01
| dvr14     = 0.9
| dvrv14    = n/a
| total14   = 2.4
| totalv14   = n/a

| title15   = Out of Time
| date15    = March 17, 2015
| rs15      = 1.3/5
| viewers15 = 3.69
| dvr15     = 1.0
| dvrv15    = 2.34
| total15   = 2.3
| totalv15  = 6.09

| title16   = Rogue Time
| date16    = March 24, 2015
| rs16      = 1.2/4
| viewers16 = 3.33
| dvr16     = 1.0
| dvrv16    = 2.37
| total16   = 2.2
| totalv16  = 5.69

| title17   = Tricksters
| date17    = March 31, 2015
| rs17      = 1.3/4
| viewers17 = 3.67
| dvr17     = 1.0
| dvrv17    = 2.43
| total17   = 2.3
| totalv17  = 6.10

| title18   = All Star Team Up
| date18    = April 14, 2015
| rs18      = 1.4/5
| viewers18 = 3.67
| dvr18     = 0.9
| dvrv18    = 2.05
| total18   = 2.3
| totalv18  = 5.72

| title19   = Who Is Harrison Wells?
| date19    = April 21, 2015
| rs19      = 1.3/4
| viewers19 = 3.75
| dvr19     = 0.9
| dvrv19    = n/a
| total19   = 2.2
| totalv19  = n/a

| title20   = The Trap
| date20    = April 28, 2015
| rs20      = 1.5/5
| viewers20 = 3.93
| dvr20     = 0.9
| dvrv20    = n/a
| total20   = 2.4
| totalv20  = n/a

| title21   = Grodd Lives
| date21    = May 5, 2015
| rs21      = 1.5/5
| viewers21 = 3.62
| dvr21     = 0.9
| dvrv21    = 2.27
| total21   = 2.4
| totalv21  = 5.97

| title22   = Rogue Air
| date22    = May 12, 2015
| rs22      = 1.5/5
| viewers22 = 3.65
| dvr22     = 0.9
| dvrv22    = n/a
| total22   = 2.4
| totalv22  = n/a

| title23   = Fast Enough
| date23    = May 19, 2015
| rs23      = 1.5/5
| viewers23 = 3.87
| dvr23     = 1.0
| dvrv23    = 2.38
| total23   = 2.5
| totalv23  = 6.25
}}
 Live +7 ratings were not available, so Live +3 ratings have been used instead.

The first episode of The Flash was watched by 4.8 million viewers and had a 1.9 18–49 demographic rating, making it The CW's most watched and highest rated series premiere since The Vampire Diaries in 2009. It also became The CW's second-most watched series premiere ever, behind 90210, and the third-highest rated in the 18–49 demographic. Factoring Live + 7 day ratings, the pilot was watched by a total of 6.8 million viewers, becoming The CW's most-watched telecast and the highest-rated premiere among men 18–34 (2.5 rating). It broke the previous record for the most-watched telecast held by the cycle 8 finale of America's Next Top Model in 2007 (6.69 million). Additionally, across all platforms, including initiated streams on digital platforms and total unduplicated viewers on-air over two airings the week of October 7, 2014, the premiere was seen more than 13 million times.

The Canadian premiere was watched by 3.11 million viewers, making it the most-watched broadcast that night and the second for that week. In the United Kingdom, the premiere was the fourth highest-rated broadcast of the week and the eleventh of that month, with 1.53 million viewers. Note: The ratings must be searched for. The timeshifted version got 82,000 viewers. The premiere in Australia was the most-watched broadcast on pay television, with 129,000 viewers tuning in.

The first season finished as the 118th ranked show, with an average viewership of 4.62 million, helping to deliver The CW's most watched season in seven years. The Flash finished the season as the most watched series ever on The CW with 5.85 million viewers, and also the highest rated series among men 18–49 (2.8 rating) and men 18+ ever on the network.

 Critical response 
Season 1 of The Flash received generally positive reviews from critics. The review aggregator website Rotten Tomatoes reported a 92% approval rating with an average rating of 7.75/10 based on 63 reviews. The website's consensus reads, "The Flash benefits from its purposefully light atmosphere, making it a superhero show uniquely geared toward genre fans as well as novices." Metacritic, which uses a weighted average, assigned a score of 73 out of 100, based on 27 reviews, indicating "generally favorable reviews".

IGN's Eric Goldman and Joshua Yehl praised the show's premise and cast after viewing a press screening copy of the pilot. Goldman and Yehl favorably compared it to Arrow, stating that The Flash progresses with a confidence that Arrow did not get until later in the series. Reviews for the series became increasingly positive as the season progressed, with the finale receiving critical acclaim. 

Noel Murray of The A.V. Club gave the season a B+ overall, giving praise to the pacing of the plot, the performances of the cast and the special effects, and also pointing out the series' boldness to embrace its comic book influences, something that conventional superhero shows tend not to do. Weekly episode reviewer Scott Von Doviak gave consistently high ratings to the season and awarded the season finale a perfect A grade, calling the episode "richly satisfying" and also commending the show for "[capturing] the essence of its source material in a fun, light-on-its-feet way that few other comic book adaptations have managed." He also gave high praise to the emotional value and performances of the cast, as well as the cliffhanger and multiple easter eggs found in the episode.

AccoladesThe Flash was included on multiple Best/Top TV Shows of 2014 lists, ranking on NPR and Omaha World-Heralds (7th), and Film School Rejects (10th). In its first season, The Flash was nominated for 35 awards, including an Emmy nomination for Outstanding Special Visual Effects for the episode "Grodd Lives", and winning nine. The show was nominated for four Saturn Awards, winning Best Superhero Adaption Television Series and Wentworth Miller winning for Best Guest Star on Television. Gustin was honored with the Breakthrough Performance Saturn Award at the ceremony for his electrifying performance as Barry Allen/The Flash. The series received eight Leo Awards nominations, including Best Dramatic Series and winning Best Visual Effects in a Dramatic Series for the episode "Going Rogue". It also won the People's Choice Award for "Favorite New TV Drama" for the 2014–15 season. The Atlantic named the season finale, "Fast Enough" one of the best television episodes of 2015.

|-
! scope="row" rowspan="2" | 2014
| Visual Effects Society Awards
| Outstanding Visual Effects in a Visual Effects-Driven Photoreal/Live Action Broadcast Program
| Armen V. Kevorkian, James Baldanzi, Jeremy Jozwick, Andranik Taranyan
| 
| 
|-
| TV Guide Award
| Favorite New Show
| The Flash| 
| 
|-
! scope="row" rowspan="28" | 2015
| People's Choice Awards
| Favorite New TV Drama
| The Flash| 
| 
|-
| rowspan="2" | Kids' Choice Awards
| Favorite Family TV Show
| The Flash| 
| 
|-
| Favorite TV Actor
| Grant Gustin
| 
| 
|-
| rowspan="4" | Saturn Awards
| Best Superhero Adaption Television Series
| The Flash| 
| 
|-
| Breakthrough Performance
| Grant Gustin
| 
| 
|-
| Best Actor on Television
| Grant Gustin
| 
| 
|-
| Best Guest Star on Television
| Wentworth Miller
| 
| 
|-
| rowspan="8" | Leo Awards
| Best Dramatic Series
| The Flash| 
| 
|-
| Best Direction in a Dramatic Series
| Glen Winter
| 
| 
|-
| Best Cinematography in a Dramatic Series
| C. Kim Miles
| 
| 
|-
| Best Visual Effects in a Dramatic Series
| For episode "Going Rogue"
| 
| 
|-
| Best Production Design in a Dramatic Series
| Tyler Bishop Harron
| 
| 
|-
| Best Make-Up in a Dramatic Series
| Tina Louise Teoli
| 
| 
|-
| Best Hairstyling in a Dramatic Series
| Sarah Koppes
| 
| 
|-
| Best Guest Performance by a Female in a Dramatic Series
| Emily Bett Rickards
| 
| 
|-
| Publicists Awards
| Maxwell Weinberg Award – Television
| Bonanza Productions, Berlanti Productions and Warner Bros. Television
| 
| 
|-
| TCA Awards
| Outstanding New Program
| The Flash| 
| 
|-
| rowspan="6" | Teen Choice Awards
| Choice TV Actress: Fantasy/Sci-Fi
| Danielle Panabaker
| 
| 
|-
| rowspan="2" | Choice TV: Breakout Star
| Grant Gustin
| 
| 
|-
| Candice Patton
| 
| 
|-
| Choice TV: Chemistry
| Grant Gustin and Candice Patton
| 
| 
|-
| Choice TV: Liplock
| Grant Gustin and Candice Patton
| 
| 
|-
| Choice TV: Villain
| Tom Cavanagh
| 
| 
|-
| Hugo Awards
| Best Dramatic Presentation – Short Form
| For the episode "Pilot"
| 
| 
|-
| Primetime Emmy Award
| Outstanding Special Visual Effects
| For episode "Grodd Lives"
| 
| 
|-
| rowspan="2" | IGN Awards
| Best TV Series
| The Flash| 
| 
|-
| Best Comic Book Adaptation TV
| The Flash''
| 
| 
|-
| Poppy Awards
| Best Actor, Drama
| Grant Gustin
| 
| 
|-
|}

Notes

References

General references

External links 
 
 

2014 American television seasons
2015 American television seasons
The Flash (2014 TV series) seasons
Identity theft in popular culture